Leah Joy Zell (born 1949) is an American business executive and chartered financial analyst. She specializes in international investing in the international small-cap category. She is the Founder and Lead Portfolio Manager of Lizard Investors LLC.

Early life and education
Zell was born in Poland to Rochelle and Berek Zielonka and fled with her parents just before the German invasion in 1939. The family immigrated to the United States, living first in Seattle before settling in Chicago. Once in Chicago, Berek Zielonka (later known as Bernard) changed the family name to Zell. She has one brother, Samuel Zell, who is an American businessman.

Zell attended Harvard University, graduating Magna Cum Laude and Phi Beta Kappa in 1971. She received her PhD in Modern European Social and Economic history from Harvard University in 1979, where she won Woodrow Wilson, Fulbright (DAAD), and Krupp Foundation fellowships. Zell received her CFA designation in 1987.

Career

In 1979, Zell began her career at Lehman Brothers as a financial analyst.

From 1992 to 2005, Zell managed several investment portfolios at Wanger Asset Management, a firm she co‐founded with her then-husband, Ralph Wanger. While there, Zell acted as Head of International Equities and as Lead Portfolio Manager of Acorn International Fund. She left her position with the Acorn Fund in 2003.

Zell joined the executive committee of the Chicago Council on Global Affairs in 2004, and still serves as its treasurer.

Zell founded Lizard Investors LLC in 2008, with offices in the Tribune Tower in Chicago.  The firm has since moved to the Chicago Equitable Building.

She has made various media appearances to share her expertise. These include CNBC's "Squawk Box" on August 28, 2013 to discuss emerging markets, and CNBC's "What’s Working" on May 13, 2013 to discuss international investing.  Her advice also appeared in the book, A Woman's Guide to Savvy Investing by Marsha Bertrand.

Zell has been featured and/or quoted as a financial analyst on Wall Street Week and Chicago Tonight, and in various newspapers and magazines, including Australian Financial Review, Barron's, The Financial Times, Money Magazine, Business Week, Pension Management, The New York Times, The Wall Street Journal, Working Women, Smart Money, U.S. News & World Report and Investment News.

Zell is a director of the Horton Trust Company. She is also a member of several advisory committees, including the Council on Foreign Relations, the Harvard Global Advisory Council, and the Radcliffe Institute Dean's Advisory Council.

References

1941 births
Living people
American women business executives
Harvard Graduate School of Arts and Sciences alumni
CFA charterholders
People from Chicago
21st-century American women